Murphysboro Township is one of sixteen townships in Jackson County, Illinois, USA.  As of the 2010 census, its population was 10,563 and it contained 5,174 housing units.

Geography

Cities, towns, villages
 Carbondale (west edge)
 Murphysboro (south three-quarters)

Unincorporated towns
 Mount Carbon at 
 Poplar Ridge at 
 Texas Junction at 
(This list is based on USGS data and may include former settlements.)

Adjacent townships
 Somerset Township (north)
 DeSoto Township (northeast)
 Carbondale Township (east)
 Makanda Township (southeast)
 Pomona Township (south)
 Sand Ridge Township (west)
 Levan Township (northwest)

Cemeteries
The township contains these twelve cemeteries: Bostick, Hall, Hiller-Crab Orchard, Mount Carbon, Mount Pleasant, Murdale Gardens of Memory, Murphysboro City, Pleasant Grove Memorial, Poplar Ridge, Saint Andrews, Tower Grove and Worthen.

Major highways
  Illinois Route 13
  Illinois Route 127
  Illinois Route 149

Airports and landing strips
 Saint Joseph Memorial Hospital Heliport

Lakes
 Browns Lake
 Carbon Lake
 Country Club Lake

Landmarks
 Lake Murphysboro State Park (southeast edge)
 Riverside Park

Demographics

School districts
 Murphysboro Community Unit School District 186

Political districts
 Illinois' 12th congressional district
 State House District 115
 State Senate District 58

References
 
 United States Census Bureau 2007 TIGER/Line Shapefiles
 United States National Atlas

External links
 City-Data.com
 Illinois State Archives
 City of Murphysboro Website

Townships in Jackson County, Illinois
Townships in Illinois